The Type 052 (NATO/OSD Luhu-class destroyer is a class of destroyers developed in the People's Republic of China (PRC) for the People's Liberation Army Navy (PLAN). The Type 052 was an intermediate between the obsolescent Type 051 and the modern Type 052B destroyers. They were the first PLAN destroyers powered by gas turbines, and the first PLAN ships with modern combat direction systems (CDS). They were also part of the first generation of PLAN warships armed with surface-to-air missiles in the form of the short-range Crotale (called HQ-7 in Chinese service.)

The Type 052 used subsystems imported from the United States and the European Union. The embargo after the 1989 Tiananmen Square protests and massacre ended the supply of and support for those subsystems, limiting production to two ships and likely affecting their operating efficiency due to system integration issues. Afterward, China turned to Russia and Ukraine for technology.

Programme
The Type 052 was the first PLAN warship where the CDS was designed before the ship. The CDS, possible the ZKJ-6 based on the Italian IPN-10 or IPN-20, began development in 1983 and underwent land-based testing in December 1986. Two ships were ordered in 1985, but delayed by export orders to Thailand. The first, Harbin, was laid down in November 1990 and commissioned in July 1994. Qingdao was commissioned in March 1996.

In 2003, Harbin was refitted with a low radar profile 100mm gun turret in 2003; Qingdao followed in 2005.

A major refit began in 2010 for Harbin and Qingdao in 2011 which included changes to sensors and weapons, gas turbine replacement, and some hull work.

Design

Machinery
The ships were completed with different gas turbines due to the embargo; Harbin with two General Electric LM2500s from the United States, and Qingdao with two Zorya-Mashproekt DA80s from Ukraine.

Sensors
The original sensors included the Type 518 air search radar, the Type 362 search radar, and the French DUBV-43 variable depth sonar. These were replaced during the 2010 refit with the Type 517 radar, the Type 362 radar, and a linear towed array sonar respectively.

Weapons
The ships are armed with an octuple HQ-7/Crotale launcher, and a total of 32 missiles. France agreed to sell the missile systems in 1986, and they were delivered after October 1990.

Four Type 76A twin 37 mm guns were installed at construction. They were removed during 2010 refit, and the aft pair replaced by a pair of Type 730 CIWS.

Other
The CDS installed on the Type 052 is unclear. One ship may have received the Thomson-CSF TAVITAC; the PRC bought two TAVITACs from France in the 1980s. The TAVITAC may be known as, or modified into, the ZKJ-5 CDS in PRC service. The other ship may have received the ZKJ-6.

The quarterdecks were built open, and enclosed during the 2010 refit.

The ships may have had severe survivability issues like earlier PLAN warships. Observations by foreign visitors to Harbin in March 1997 suggested limited damage control capability and crew safety features.

Operational history
Qingdao participated in the PLAN's first cruise to circumnavigate Earth in 2002. German technicians were flown in to repair its diesel engines during the cruise.

Ships of the class

Gallery

See also
List of naval ship classes in service

References

Bibliography
 

Destroyer classes